Prior to the arrival of Europeans, Australian Aboriginal languages had been purely spoken languages, and had no writing system. On their arrival, Latin script became a standard for transcription of Australian Aboriginal languages, but the details of how the sounds were represented has varied over time and from writer to writer, sometimes resulting in a great many variant spellings of the same word or name.

Early writing
At first, most Australian languages were written following English orthography (or in a few cases, German orthography), as it sounded to the writer. This meant that sounds which were distinguished in Australian languages but not in English were written identically, while at the same time sounds which were allophones in Australian languages but distinct in English were written differently.

Most Aboriginal words used in English follow these early conventions, and therefore do not usually give a good idea of how the word was pronounced in the original language.

Modern practical orthography
Linguists working with Australian languages today purposely use unambiguous phonemic orthographies based on detailed phonological analysis of the language in question. In orthographies of this kind each spoken word can only be written one way, and each written word can only be read one way.

Usually, but not always, practical orthographies use just the letters of the basic Roman alphabet. This necessitates the use of digraphs for sounds that do not have a standard character.

Vowels and semivowels
Long vowels are represented by double letters, i.e.

Gamilaraay yinarr "woman" is actually pronounced .

A handful of languages have a dental semivowel, which is written  (see Place of articulation below).

Rhotics
Most Australian languages have two rhotics or r-like sounds: a retroflex approximant, as in American English, written ; and a trill or flap (both of which are found in Spanish), written .

In languages that have only one of the two r's, it is simply written .

Place of articulation
The bilabial, velar and alveolar consonants are usually written the same as in English, i.e. Note that  sounds like the ng in singer, not as in finger; the latter would be written .

Dental consonants are represented by a digraph made of an alveolar consonant + , i.e. Note that  is not a fricative as in Australian English, but a stop as in Irish English.

Retroflex consonants are usually represented by a digraph made of  + an alveolar consonant, i.e.

A handful of languages have palato-velar consonants, between palatal and velar. For Yanyuwa, these are written  ,   (a prenasalised stop—see Prenasalisation below),  .

Voicing of stops
Most Australian languages do not distinguish between voiced and voiceless stops, so that e.g. t and d both occur as variants of the same sound. Both the voiced and voiceless allophone will usually be written the same way, but whether to use the voiceless symbol or the voiced symbol varies depending on which occurs more frequently in the language. Some languages have been written using the voiced symbols by one linguist and the voiceless symbols by another. Moreover, some linguists choose to use voiceless symbols for some consonants in a language and voiced symbols for others.

Some languages do distinguish between voiced and voiceless stops, however.

Prenasalisation
Some languages have prenasalized consonants, a stop preceded by a nasal sound which is considered one consonant.

Other systems

Russian system
Below is the Russian Wikipedia's transcription system for Indigenous Australian languages.

References

Bibliography

External links
The Phonetics and Phonology of Australian Aboriginal Languages

Australian Aboriginal languages
Phonetic alphabets
Transcription (linguistics)